Mark A. Luft is a Republican member of the Illinois House from the 91st district since January 13, 2021 and the mayor of Pekin since April 2019. The 91st district, located in the Peoria metropolitan area, includes all or parts of Banner, Bartonville, Bryant, Canton, Creve Coeur, Cuba, Dunfermline, East Peoria, Fairview, Farmington, Glasford, Hanna City, Kingston Mines, Lake Camelot, Lewistown, Liverpool, Mapleton, Marquette Heights, Morton, Norris, North Pekin, Norwood, Pekin, South Pekin, and St. David.

Luft was elected to the district to succeed retiring Republican Michael D. Unes.

Early life, education, and career
Luft was born in Pekin, Illinois. He "graduated from Pekin Community High School and attended Eastern Illinois University." He worked for the Illinois American Water Company for 26 years. He served in the United States Army Reserves from 1987 to 1994. He previously "served as President and Chairman of the Board of the Pekin JFL."

Political career
In 2015, Luft was elected to the Pekin City Council. In 2019, he successfully defeated incumbent Mayor John McCabe. As early as November 2019, Luft was circulating petitions to run for the open Illinois 91st State House district seat after incumbent Michael D. Unes decided to not run. Luft was originally going to face two primary candidates, Sam Goddard and Corey Campbell, before they were removed from the ballot for "insufficient signatures on their nominating petitions" by the Illinois State Board of Elections. After winning his primary, Luft would win in the 91st district general election with a 26% vote margin. On June 28, 2022, Travis Weaver, son of former Senator Chuck Weaver, defeated Luft for the Republican nomination in the newly drawn 93rd district.

As of July 3, 2022, Representative Luft is a member of the following Illinois House committees:

 Appropriations - General Service Committee (HAPG)
 Cities & Villages Committee (HCIV)
 Economic Opportunity & Equity Committee (HECO)
 Housing Committee (SHOU)
 Property Tax Subcommittee (HREF-PRTX)
 Public Utilities Committee (HPUB)
 Revenue & Finance Committee (HREF)
 Water Subcommittee (HPUB-WATR)

Mark Luft lost the 2022 Republican primary to Travis Weaver, the son of former Senator Chuck Weaver.

Electoral history

Personal life
Luft currently resides in Pekin, Illinois with his wife Lelonie. They have five children.

References

External links
Representative Mark Luft (R) at the Illinois General Assembly
Constituent Website

21st-century American politicians
Living people
Republican Party members of the Illinois House of Representatives
Year of birth missing (living people)